The Sony Ericsson Xperia acro is an Android-based smartphone produced by Sony Ericsson Mobile Communications in Japan. The device has several additional functions for Japan customers from Xperia Arc. It was launched on 24 June 2011.

This model is the last Sony Ericsson branded phone to be released in Japan, while Xperia Arc S is the last internationally.

Sony Mobile Communications (formerly Sony Ericsson Mobile Communications) released the Sony Ericsson Xperia acro HD as succeeding model of Xperia acro.

Basics 
The Xperia acro is supplied by "NTT DoCoMo" and "au by KDDI" which are Japanese mobile phone operators. Each operators' devices are called Xperia acro SO-02C (NTT docomo) and Xperia acro IS11S (au).

Each mobile phone operators adopt different communication interfaces. The "Xperia acro IS11S" supported CDMA2000 with Japanese Xperia product first.

The Xperia Acro is available in a choice of either Black, White, Aqua (SO-02C only),or Ruby (IS11S only).

Specs 
 OS – Android 2.3.3 (Gingerbread); no official support to upgrade to Android 4.0; custom ROM's available
 CPU – 1 GHz Qualcomm Snapdragon processor
 RAM – 512 MB
 SDHC – 32 GB microSDHC (expandable up to 32GB)
 Display – 854x480 pixels, 4.2-inch Reality display, Sony Mobile BRAVIA Engine
 Image sensor – 8.1 mega-pixel camera (Exmor R)
 Image output – HDMI-out

Added functions for Japan 
 FeliCa(NFC) – used for Wallet Mobile in Japan
 IrDA – used for the exchange of the address book with the existing Japanese cell-phone. (Refer to 'Feature phone', 'Mobile phone industry in Japan')
 1seg – is a mobile terrestrial digital audio/video and data broadcasting service in Japan.

Gallery

Xperia acro HD

See also
List of Xperia devices
Xperia Arc
Xperia acro S
:ja:SO-02C
:ja:IS11S

References

External links
Xperia acro SO-02C official website
Xperia acro SO-02C Whitepaper PDF with technical details
Xperia acro IS11S official website
Xperia acro IS11S Whitepaper PDF with technical details

Android (operating system) devices
Sony Ericsson smartphones
Mobile phones introduced in 2011